Rasmus Nissen may refer to:
 Rasmus Kristensen (Rasmus Nissen Kristensen, born 1997), Danish footballer
 Rasmus Nissen (footballer, born 2001), Danish footballer
 Rasmus Tønder Nissen (1822–1882), Norwegian, educator, theologian and politician